The International Black Sea University (IBSU) was established in 1995 in Tbilisi, Georgia and was opened by the second president of Georgia Eduard Shevardnadze and the former prime minister of Turkey Tansu Çiller in accordance with the decree of the Council of Ministers and the License of Opening given by the Ministry of Education of Georgia.

International Black Sea University has the objective of training Georgian and foreign students in scientific, technical and professional fields of study, and of using these studies in the fields of pure and applied research for contributing to the economic and social necessities of Georgia and other countries.

The languages of instruction are English and Georgian.

Faculties 
International Black Sea University serves the following areas of education for BA, MA, PhD degrees. 
Faculty of Social Sciences and Humanities 
Faculty of Business and Computer Technologies
Faculty of Law

References

External links 

 Official website
 Online courses of IBSU
 IBSU Scientific Journal
 IBSU Silkroad Research and Information Center

Universities in Georgia (country)
Educational institutions established in 1995
Education in Tbilisi
1995 establishments in Georgia (country)